Janice Charette is a Canadian public servant and diplomat serving as the clerk of the Privy Council and secretary to the Cabinet since 2021. Charette was the Canadian high commissioner to the United Kingdom from 2016 to 2021 and previously served as clerk of the Privy Council from 2014 to 2016.

Early and personal life 
Born and raised in Ottawa, Ontario, Charette attended Carleton University, where she completed a Bachelor of Commerce degree. Charette is married to Reg Charette. Together they have two adult children, Jed and Cassie.

Career 
Charette joined the public service in 1984, working in the Department of Finance.

 1988 – 1989— Policy Analyst, Office of Privatization and Regulatory Affair.
 1989 – 1991— Senior Departmental Assistant, Office of the Minister of Finance.
 1991 – 1992— Senior Policy Adviser, Federal-Provincial Relations Office.
 1992 – 1993— Senior Departmental Assistant, Office of the Minister of Finance, then Executive Assistant to the Chief of Staff, Office of the Prime Minister.
 1994 – 1996— Co-ordinator, Base Closures Task Force, then Director of Operations, Program Review Secretariat, and Executive Director, Strategic Projects Unit, Privy Council Office.
She served as the deputy minister for Citizenship and Immigration Canada from 2004 until 2006, and as the deputy minister of Human Resources and Skills Development Canada from 2006 until 2010.

Charette was appointed as the clerk of the Privy Council and Secretary to the Cabinet on August 20, 2014, when Prime Minister Stephen Harper announced that she would replace Wayne Wouters, who served from 2009 to 2014. She is the second woman to have held that post, which is the top civil service position in the federal government.

On January 22, 2016, Prime Minister Justin Trudeau announced that Michael Wernick would replace Charette as clerk of the Privy Council. 

On July 19, 2016, she was appointed as the Canadian high commissioner to the United Kingdom. This was seen as a consolation prize after Prime Minister Justin Trudeau abruptly removed Ms. Charette as the country's top bureaucrat shortly after taking power. 

On March 1, 2021, Prime Minister Trudeau announced that Charette would serve as interim clerk of the Privy Council Office starting on March 9, 2021 while current clerk Ian Shugart underwent cancer treatment. She was subsequently permanently named to the position on May 25, 2022.

Volunteer work 
Charette is a member of the board of directors of Royal Ottawa Healthcare Group and on the advisory board of the School of Policy Studies at Queen’s University.

In 2008, she was national Chair for the United Way’s Government of Canada Workplace Charitable Campaign, raising over CA$136 million for communities and national health charities across Canada.

References 

Clerks of the Privy Council (Canada)
Carleton University alumni
Living people
High Commissioners of Canada to the United Kingdom
People from Ottawa
Canadian women ambassadors
Year of birth missing (living people)